Jordan Lee Raymond Williams (born 13 December 1992) is an English professional footballer who plays for Cymru Premier side The New Saints, as a winger.

Club career
Born in Whiston, Williams grew up supporting Liverpool and played for the youth teams of Penlake Juniors and Ashton Athletic. He graduated to the reserves and first team at Ashton, and then followed the manager to Clitheroe, in May 2012. He departed from the club in November 2012 for Burscough who he played for whilst studying for a teaching degree at nearby Edge Hill University. He moved to Northwich Victoria in summer 2015 where he helped the club progress to the second round of the 2015–16 FA Cup, where over the ten game run he scored six goals.

In January 2016 he signed for Barrow, before signing for League One club Rochdale in June 2017. He moved on loan to Lincoln City in January 2018. Williams was cup-tied for Lincoln's win in the 2018 EFL Trophy Final.

He was released by Rochdale at the end of the 2018–19 season. On 31 May 2019, Williams agreed to join National League side AFC Fylde on a two-year contract following the expiration of his contract with Rochdale.

On 14 August 2020, Williams signed a two-year contract with for Stockport County for an undisclosed fee.

In June 2021, he signed for Cymru Premier side, The New Saints. He scored seventeen goals in 41 games for the club during the 2021–22 season including scoring twice in a 3–2 victory in the final of the Welsh Cup.

International career
Williams was capped by the England C team during his time at Barrow, winning his only cap in 2016.

Career statistics

Honours

The New Saints
Cymru Premier: Champions: – 2021–22
Welsh Cup: Winners – 2021–22

References

1992 births
Living people
AFC Fylde players
Ashton Athletic F.C. players
Barrow A.F.C. players
Burscough F.C. players
Clitheroe F.C. players
Lincoln City F.C. players
Northwich Victoria F.C. players
Rochdale A.F.C. players
Stockport County F.C. players
The New Saints F.C. players
Alumni of Edge Hill University
Association football wingers
Cymru Premier players
English footballers
English Football League players
England semi-pro international footballers
Footballers from Warrington
National League (English football) players
Northern Premier League players
North West Counties Football League players
People from Whiston, Merseyside